Albert Wagner (March 14, 1848 – August 24, 1898) was an architect from Germany who worked in New York City.  Born in Poessneck, Germany, he moved to New York in 1871. He designed the Puck Building, expanded years later according to designs by his relative Herman Wagner. The building housed Puck magazine. Wagner also designed 140 Franklin Street (1887), a building later converted to lofts, and 134-136 Spring Street, where clothing businesses were housed. He used terra cotta, Romanesque style stone and brickwork, and ornate ironwork in his buildings.

Wagner's office was at 67 University Place.

Frederick Lewis Wagner was his son.

Wagner died in on August 24, 1898 in New York.

Work

Puck Building bounded by West Houston Street, Mulberry Street, Jersey Street and Lafayette Street
140 Franklin Street

Storage Building 260-266 West 36th Street.
134 Spring Street (1896), in the Soho - Cast Iron Historic District
53-55 Elizabeth Street, a 7-story Philadelphia face brick and iron building for Phillip Stroebel & Sons.
233 - 236 East 59th Street renovation
"Down Town Power House" cable station, Bayard Street and Bowery to Elizabeth Street, a Third Avenue Railroad Company project
Ludwig Baumann & Company Building, West 35th Street & 8th Avenue (1897)

References

19th-century German architects
1848 births
1898 deaths